The cerebellar tonsil (Latin: tonsilla cerebelli) is a rounded lobule on the undersurface of each cerebellar hemisphere, continuous medially with the uvula of the cerebellar vermis and superiorly by the flocculonodular lobe. Synonyms include: tonsilla cerebelli, amygdala cerebelli, the latter of which is not to be confused with the cerebral tonsils or amygdala nuclei located deep within the medial temporal lobes of the cerebral cortex. 

The flocculonodular lobe of the cerebellum, which can also be confused for the cerebellar tonsils, is one of three lobes that make up the overall composition of the cerebellum. The cerebellum consists of three anatomical and functional lobes: anterior lobe, posterior lobe, and flocculonodular lobe.

The cerebellar tonsil is part of the posterior lobe, also known as the neocerebellum, which is responsible for coordinating the voluntary movement of the distal parts of limbs.

Elongation of the cerebellar tonsils can, due to pressure, lead to this portion of the cerebellum to slip or be pushed through the foramen magnum of the skull resulting in tonsillar herniation. This is a life-threatening condition as it causes increased pressure on the medulla oblongata which contains respiratory and cardiac control centres. A congenital condition of tonsillar herniation of either one or both tonsils is Chiari malformation.

Pathology
A Type I Chiari malformation is a congenital anomaly of the brain in which the cerebellar tonsils are elongated and pushed down through the opening of the base of the skull (see foramen magnum), blocking the flow of cerebrospinal fluid (CSF) as it exits through the medial and lateral apertures of the fourth ventricle. Also called cerebellar tonsillar ectopia, or tonsillar herniation. Although often congenital, Chiari malformation symptoms can also be induced due to physical head trauma, commonly from raised intracranial pressure secondary to a hematoma, or increased dural strain pulling the brain caudally into the foramen magnum. Head trauma increases risk of cerebellar tonsillar ectopia by a factor of 4. Ectopia may be present but asymptomatic until whiplash causes it to become symptomatic.

Additional images

References

Cerebellum